List of states by population density may refer to:

List of U.S. states and territories by population density
List of countries and dependencies by population density